{{DISPLAYTITLE:En (Lie algebra)}}

In mathematics, especially in Lie theory, En is the Kac–Moody algebra whose Dynkin diagram is a bifurcating graph with three branches of length 1, 2 and k, with k = n − 4.

In some older books and papers, E2 and E4 are used as names for G2 and F4.

Finite-dimensional Lie algebras

The En group is similar to the An group, except the nth node is connected to the 3rd node. So the Cartan matrix appears similar, -1 above and below the diagonal, except for the last row and column, have −1 in the third row and column. The determinant of the Cartan matrix for En is 9 − n.

E3 is another name for the Lie algebra A1A2 of dimension 11, with Cartan determinant 6.

E4 is another name for the Lie algebra A4 of dimension 24, with Cartan determinant 5.

E5 is another name for the Lie algebra D5 of dimension 45, with Cartan determinant 4.

E6 is the exceptional Lie algebra of dimension 78, with Cartan determinant 3.

E7 is the exceptional Lie algebra of dimension 133, with Cartan determinant 2.

E8 is  the exceptional Lie algebra  of dimension 248, with Cartan determinant 1.

Infinite-dimensional Lie algebras
E9 is another name for the infinite-dimensional affine Lie algebra  (also as E8+ or E8(1) as a (one-node) extended E8) (or E8 lattice) corresponding to the Lie algebra of type E8. E9 has a Cartan matrix with determinant 0.

  E10 (or E8++ or E8(1)^ as a (two-node) over-extended E8) is an infinite-dimensional Kac–Moody algebra whose root lattice is the even Lorentzian unimodular lattice II9,1 of dimension 10. Some of its root multiplicities have been calculated; for small roots the multiplicities seem to be well behaved, but for larger roots the observed patterns break down. E10 has a Cartan matrix with determinant −1:

E11 (or E8+++ as a (three-node) very-extended E8) is a Lorentzian algebra, containing one time-like imaginary dimension, that has been conjectured to generate the symmetry "group" of M-theory.
En for n≥12 is an infinite-dimensional Kac–Moody algebra that has not been studied much.

Root lattice
The root lattice of En has determinant 9 − n, and can be constructed as the lattice of vectors in the unimodular Lorentzian lattice Zn,1  that are  orthogonal to the vector (1,1,1,1,...,1|3) of norm n × 12 − 32 = n − 9.

E7½

Landsberg and Manivel extended the definition of En for integer n to include the case n = 7. They did this in order to fill the "hole" in dimension formulae for representations of the En series which was observed by Cvitanovic, Deligne, Cohen and de Man. E7 has dimension 190, but is not a simple Lie algebra: it contains a 57 dimensional Heisenberg algebra as its nilradical.

See also 
 k21, 2k1, 1k2 polytopes based on En Lie algebras.

References

Further reading 
 Class. Quantum Grav. 18 (2001) 4443-4460
 Guersey Memorial Conference Proceedings '94

 Connections between Kac-Moody algebras and M-theory, Paul P. Cook, 2006 
 A class of Lorentzian Kac-Moody algebras, Matthias R. Gaberdiel, David I. Olive and Peter C. West, 2002 

Lie groups